American singer Nicole Wray has released two studio albums, one collaborative album, two compilation albums, one EP, and 31 singles (include 11 singles as a featured performer).

She released her first album, Make It Hot, in 1998. It peaked at number 42 on the US Billboard 200 and produced the singles "Make It Hot", "I Can't See", and "Eyes Better Not Wander". After a hiatus, Wray released two compilation albums Boss Chick (2010) and Dream Factory Sessions (2011), which featured unreleased songs. In 2016, she adopted the stage name Lady Wray and released her second album Queen Alone on Big Crown Records.

Albums

Studio albums

Collaborative albums

Compilation albums

Extended plays

Singles

As lead artist

As featured artist

Soundtrack appearances

Album appearances

Music videos
 "Make It Hot" (featuring Missy Elliott and Mocha)
 "I Can't See" (featuring Missy Elliott and Mocha)
 "Eyes Better Not Wander"
 "All n My Grill" (Missy Elliott featuring Nicole Wray and Big Boi)
 "I'm Lookin'"
 "If I Was Your Girlfriend"
 "Love My Life" (Cam'Ron featuring Nicole Wray)
 "I Like It" (featuring 2 Chainz)
 "Get Ready"
 "Do It Again"
 "Smiling"
 "Underneath My Feet"
 "Under the Sun"

Notes

References

Discographies of American artists
Contemporary R&B discographies